Klubi Futbollistik Besiana (KF Besiana) was a football club based in Podujevo (known in Albanian as Besiana), Kosovo. It was founded in 1984 and played in the second division of football in Kosovo, Liga e Parë. Former Kosovo football legend Fadil Vokrri is one of founders of the club.

History 
KF Besiana are one-time Champions of Kosovo, winning in 2002, and also won the Kosovar Cup and Kosovar Super Cup in the same season. The team colours are yellow and navy blue.

The city rivals were KF Hysi, who play in the Kosovar Superliga, and KF Llapi, who play in the second division, Liga e Parë.

KF Besiana is the brother team of Turkish champion Fenerbahçe SK.

KF Besiana won the Kosovar Superliga and the Kosovo Cup during the 2001/02 season.

Honours 
Champions of Kosovo: 1
2001/02
Kosovar Cup: 1
2001/02
Kosovar Super Cup: 1
2001/02

References and notes

External links 
KF Besiana Club info at AlbaniaSoccer

Defunct football clubs in Kosovo
Association football clubs established in 1984
1984 establishments in Serbia
Podujevo